SMS Jaguar was the second member of the  of gunboats built for the German Kaiserliche Marine (Imperial Navy) in the late 1890s and early 1900s, for overseas service in the German colonial empire.  Other ships of the class are SMS Iltis, SMS Luchs, SMS Tiger, SMS Eber and SMS Panther.

Design

She displaced  at full load. Her propulsion system consisted of a pair of horizontal triple-expansion steam engines each driving a single screw propeller, with steam supplied by four coal-fired Thornycroft boilers. Jaguar was armed with a main battery of four  SK L/30 guns, with 1,124 rounds of ammunition. She also carried six machine guns.

Service history

The keel for Jaguar was laid down at the Schichau-Werke shipyard in Danzig in early 1898. Her completed hull was launched on 19 September 1898 and after completing fitting-out work, the new gunboat was commissioned into the German fleet on 4 April 1899. She departed Kiel on 1 June 1899. After passing the Torres Strait and calling on Herbertshöhe in the German Bismarck Islands, she made port calls at Ambon and Makassar in the Netherlands East Indies, and Singapore. She then visited Pohnpei in the Caroline Islands (13 October), Palau (3 November) and Saipan in the Mariana Islands (17 November) with the governor of German New Guinea, Rudolf von Bennigsen on board in order to raise the German flag confirming change in possession of these island groups from Spain to the German Empire per the terms of the German-Spanish Treaty. She reached Shanghai on 30 November, where she made repairs, and arrived at Tsingtao on 4 July 1900 to come under the command of the German East Asia Squadron.

Shortly thereafter, the Boxer Rebellion broke out in China. Kaiser Wilhelm II decided that an expeditionary force was necessary to reinforce the Eight Nation Alliance that had formed to defeat the Boxers. The expeditionary force consisted of the four s, six cruisers, ten freighters, three torpedo boats, and six regiments of marines, under the command of Marshal Alfred von Waldersee. Jaguar took part in combat operations along the Chinese coast and in the Yangtze River. Afterwards, she underwent a major overhaul at Nagasaki in Japan in 1902.

In concert with the unprotected cruiser , Jaguar participated in the suppression of unrest in the Marshall Islands in September and October 1908. During this operation, the ships carried a contingent of Melanesian infantry to the island of Pohnpei to suppress tensions between rival factions on the island. She later transported the leaders of the Mau movement for independence to exile in Jaluit, and returned to her home port in China in May 1909.

In December 1910, Jaguar supported British forces against an uprising in Wuhan, remaining stationed in Wuhan to February 1911. With the start of the Xinhai Revolution, Jaguar was sent to protect the German consulate at Fuzhou, which also had a large foreign missionary population. In February 1914, she ran hard aground in the Yangtze River, and was repaired locally. Although World War I had started in Europe, she was repaired at a British-owned dock in July 1914, and sailed at night for Tsingtao to avoid British warships.

When Jaguar arrived at Tsingtao of 4 August 1914 she was the only operational German warship, as her sister ships had been stripped of their guns to equip the auxiliary cruiser SS Prinz Eitel Friedrich which sailed on the following day to join Admiral Graf von Spee and the German Far East squadron at Pagan in the Caroline Islands.

Jaguar participated in combat operations against the Imperial Japanese Navy at the Siege of Tsingtao, together with the Austro-Hungarian Navy cruiser . She was received a direct hit to her bow on 4 October. Jaguar was scuttled on 7 November 1914 at the German colony in the Kiautschou Bay concession, on the final day of the Siege of Tsingtao. Three of her sisters were also scuttled during the siege.

Notes

References

Further reading

1898 ships
Ships built in Danzig
Iltis-class gunboats
World War I naval ships of Germany
Maritime incidents in November 1914
Scuttled vessels of Germany
World War I shipwrecks in the Pacific Ocean
Shipwrecks of China